Othippiini is a tribe of true weevils in the beetle family Curculionidae. Of the eight genera in Othippiini, only Egiona and Othippia are not monotypic. Acoptus suturalis is the only species of the tribe found in the New World.

Genera
These eight genera belong to the tribe Othippiini:
 Abrimoides Kojima & Lyal, 2002
 Acoptus LeConte, 1876
 Brimoda Pascoe, 1871
 Brimoides Kojima & Lyal, 2002
 Chelothippia Marshall, 1938
 Egiona Pascoe, 1874
 Othippia Pascoe, 1874
 Rimboda Heller, 1925

References

Further reading

 
 
 
 

Weevils